Red Hill South is a rural locality and township on the Mornington Peninsula in Melbourne, Victoria, Australia, approximately  south-east of Melbourne's Central Business District, located within the Shire of Mornington Peninsula local government area. Red Hill South recorded a population of 708 at the 2021 census.

There are several wineries in the area and it is referred to as the 'hinterland' of the Mornington Peninsula.

Red Hill South Post Office opened on 22 January 1923.

See also
 Shire of Hastings – Red Hill South was previously within this former local government area.

References

Towns in Victoria (Australia)
Mornington Peninsula
Western Port